Alternanthera grandis is a species of plant in the family Amaranthaceae. It is endemic to Ecuador.  Its natural habitats are subtropical or tropical dry forests, subtropical or tropical dry shrubland, and subtropical or tropical high-altitude grassland. It is threatened by habitat loss.

References

Flora of Ecuador
grandis
Vulnerable plants
Taxonomy articles created by Polbot